Cryptolechia peditata is a moth in the family Depressariidae. It was described by Wang in 2006. It is found in Hubei, China.

The length of the forewings is 12.5–13 mm. The forewings are brown, the costal margin with a whitish-yellow spot halfway and at one-sixth. There is a dark brown dot in the middle of the cell, at the end of the cell and at the middle of the fold. The hindwings are grey.

Etymology
The species name refers to the footshaped valva and is derived from Latin peditatus (meaning foot).

References

Moths described in 2006
Cryptolechia (moth)